The Slovak Police Force (SPF), officially the Police Force (Slovak: Policajný zbor), is the national police force of Slovakia.

The Force is part of and extremely active in both Europol and Interpol. In the recent years the force has been involved in international crime much more than years past.

Along with serving in Slovakia, the Force along with the Customs Administration of the Slovak Republic has been active in neighbouring European countries as well, including Austria, Hungary and Poland.

History
The independent police force in Slovakia was established on 1st March 1991 under the name of Police Force of the Slovak Republic (Slovak: Policajný zbor Slovenskej republiky) by renaming the Slovak part of the Public Security (Slovak: Verejná bezpečnosť). 

After the dissolution of Czechoslovakia in the end of 1992, the agency was renamed to Police Force (Slovak: Policajný zbor) in effect from 1st September 1993. However, in its logo, the old name has still been used.

Equipment

Vehicles

The SPF operated the following fleet of vehicles:
 Kia Sportage
 Kia Ceed
 Nissan X-Trail T31/T32
 SEAT Leon
 Škoda Fabia
 Volkswagen Golf
 Volkswagen Touareg
 GAZ Tigr

Aircraft

 Bell 429 - four ordered, 2 delivery with one hull loss in 2017.

Weapons

 Benelli M3
 CZ 75
 Glock 17
 Heckler & Koch MP5
 Vz.58
 APC-9

Uniform

Typical SPF uniforms consist of a black or dark green beret. The vest, shirt or jacket will have Polícia scripted on the reverse. A tactical belt and black slacks follow. Black combat boots or shoes depending on region or rank.

Weather also plays a key role, officers typically opt for short sleeves in summer and spring and long sleeve or jackets during the winter months. Uniforms are typically unisex and do not vary from male to female.

Presidents

Branches
Branches within include:
 Organized Crime Bureau
 Judicial and Criminal Police Bureau and the Border and Aliens Police Bureau 
 Traffic Police
 Railway Police
 Riot Railway Police
 Financial Police
 Riot Police
 Police Emergency Units of Riot Police departments of the Regional Police Headquarters of the Police Force (Slovak: Pohotovostné policajné útvary OPP KR PZ)
 Special protection department of the Office for protection of state officials and diplomatic missions (Slovak: Odbor špeciálnej ochrany Úradu pre ochranu ústavných činiteľov a diplomatických misií MV SR)
 Criminal Police
 Border and Foreigner Police
 Toll Police

References

External links
 Official account on Facebook

Law enforcement in Slovakia
Law enforcement agencies in Europe